Zubaidah Begum (died 1632) was the daughter of shah Abbas the Great of Persia (r. 1588–1629). 

She was the aunt of shah Safi of Persia (r. 1629–1642). 

She played a political role on the power struggle when her nephew succeeded to the throne in 1629, which eventually resulted in the execution of her sons.

References

 

16th-century births
17th-century deaths
17th-century Iranian women
Safavid princesses